The Taiwanese barbel moray, Cirrimaxilla formosa, is a species of eel in the family Muraenidae, and the only member of the genus Cirrimaxilla. It was described by Hong Ming Chen and K. T. Shao in 1995. It is found only in Pingtung County, Taiwan.

References

Muraenidae
Fish of Taiwan
Endemic fauna of Taiwan
Monotypic fish genera
Fish described in 1995